Star League may refer to:

 the Star League, part of the BattleTech (fictional setting)
 Qatar Stars League, the top level football league in Qatar
 Star League (Hesse), an alliance of nobles opposed to the Landgraviate of Hesse